NGC 5468 is an intermediate spiral galaxy located in the constellation Virgo. It is located at a distance of about 140 million light-years from Earth, which, given its apparent dimensions, means that NGC 5468 is about 110,000 light-years across. It was discovered by William Herschel on March 5, 1785.

NGC 5468 has been home to six supernovae observed since 1999: SN 1999cp (type Ia, mag. 18.2), SN 2002cr (type Ia, mag. 16.5), SN 2002ed (type IIP, mag. 16.5), SN 2005P (type Ia-pec, mag. 18.1), SN 2018dfg (type IIb, mag. 15.9), and SN 2023cj (type Ic, mag. 17).  NGC 5468 is seen face-on, and the spiral pattern is open. The two principal arms emanate from a small bar and start to branch into several thin fragments after some distance. Three large H II regions and some fainter ones can be seen in the images of the Carnegie Atlas of Galaxies. These regions feature intense star formation. SN 2005P was located at the edge of one of these regions.

NGC 5468 forms a non-interacting pair with NGC 5472, which lies at a projected distance of 5.1 arcminutes. NGC 5468 belongs to the NGC 5493 galaxy group. Other members of the group are the interacting pair Arp 271 (NGC 5426 and NGC 5427), NGC 5476, and NGC 5493.

Gallery

References

External links 
 

Intermediate spiral galaxies
Virgo (constellation)
5468
UGCA objects
50323
Astronomical objects discovered in 1785
Discoveries by William Herschel